Vorobzha is a rural locality (a khutor) in Vysoksky Selsoviet Rural Settlement, Medvensky District, Kursk Oblast, Russia. Population:

Geography 
The khutor is located on the Vorobzha River (a left tributary of the Seym River), 63 km from the Russia–Ukraine border, 27 km south-west of Kursk, 16 km north-west of the district center – the urban-type settlement Medvenka, 10 km from the selsoviet center – Vysokoye.

 Climate
Vorobzha has a warm-summer humid continental climate (Dfb in the Köppen climate classification).

Transport 
Vorobzha is located 8 km from the federal route  Crimea Highway (a part of the European route ), 7.5 km from the road of regional importance  (Dyakonovo – Sudzha – border with Ukraine), 4 km from the road  (M2 Crimea Highway – 38K-004), on the road of intermunicipal significance  (38K-009 – Vorobzha), 15.5 km from the nearest railway station Dyakonovo (railway line Lgov I — Kursk).

The rural locality is situated 36 km from Kursk Vostochny Airport, 105 km from Belgorod International Airport and 231 km from Voronezh Peter the Great Airport.

References

Notes

Sources

Rural localities in Medvensky District